Polish Prince may refer to:

 The Prince of Poland
 Królewicz, title given to the sons and daughters of the king of Poland
 Andrzej Fonfara (born 1987), Polish light heavyweight boxer
 Alan Kulwicki (1954–1993), American auto racing driver and team owner
 Edward Wiskoski (born 1945), American professional wrestler
 Bobby Vinton (born 1935), American singer, songwriter, and actor

Polish princes
Princes of Poland